Robert Marc Bakish (born December 14, 1963) is an American business executive. He has been President and CEO of Paramount Global since December 4, 2019, formerly holding the same position at Viacom before the merger with CBS Corporation.

Early life and education 
A native of New Jersey, Bakish attended Dwight-Englewood School in Englewood, New Jersey, graduating in 1981.

He received a Bachelor of Science in operations research in 1985 from Columbia University's School of Engineering and Applied Science. He earned an MBA from Columbia Business School in 1989.

After receiving his MBA, Bakish joined the management and technology consulting firm Booz Allen Hamilton in 1990, and rose to become a partner in its media and entertainment practice.

Career at Paramount

Early positions 
In February 1997, Bakish joined Viacom. Initially as Vice President of Planning and Development, he became Senior Vice President of Planning, Development and
Technology in January 1998.

In October 1999, he became the Executive Vice President of Planning and Business Development of Viacom's subsidiary MTV Networks. From 2001 through 2004, he was Executive Vice President and Chief Operating Officer of advertising sales at MTV Networks. 

In 2004, he was appointed Executive Vice President of Operations of Viacom, Inc., and in 2006 he was also appointed Executive Vice President of Viacom Enterprises. In these two positions, he was responsible for Viacom's strategic planning and business development plus oversight of a range of business units including Famous Music, Famous Players, Viacom Plus sales and information services and technology, as well as heading Viacom's cross-divisional marketing council.

Head of international operations 
In January 2007 Bakish became President of MTV Networks International (MTVNI), with financial and management responsibility for MTVNI, overseeing all MTV Networks operations outside the U.S. He immediately restructured MTVNI, cutting 8% of the workforce in addition to merging some overseas units with the UK business and devolving responsibilities for Latin American operations to new offices across the region. He launched the popular Colors franchise of networks via the Viacom18 joint venture in the high-growth market of India. MTVNI had double-digit, year-on-year growth during his tenure. 

When MTVNI CEO Bill Roedy resigned in January 2011, Bakish was promoted to the newly created position of President and CEO of Viacom International Media Networks (VIMN). This promotion included responsibility for all Viacom media networks and operations internationally, including MTV, Nickelodeon, Comedy Central, BET, VH1, VIVA, TMF, Game One and MTV Tres; plus oversight of all of Viacom’s international TV-related joint ventures, including Viacom18 in India and ViacomSBS in Korea, as well as channel ventures with BSkyB in the UK and Foxtel in Australia. In all, VIMN operations at the time of his appointment consisted of 145 television channels in 160 countries and territories, plus related digital properties and consumer products businesses. During his tenure, Bakish expanded Viacom's international footprint, and VIMN was Viacom's most successful division; revenue doubled, and VIMN grew to more than 200 television channels. Under his leadership, the Paramount Channel was launched, offering movies and television shows in Europe, Latin America and Russia. He oversaw the expansion of networks such as Nickelodeon, Comedy Central and Spike to an increasing number of foreign markets, and helped orchestrate the acquisition of Channel 5 in the UK and Telefe in Argentina. He also oversaw the launch of apps, including the Viacom Play Plex suite of branded mobile TV apps and the BET Play direct-to-consumer subscription video-on-demand app for an adult audience.

CEO 
In October 2016, Bakish was named acting President and CEO of Viacom effective November 15, replacing interim CEO Tom Dooley. Simultaneously, he was also appointed President and CEO of the newly created Viacom Global Entertainment Group, combining Viacom International Media Networks (VIMN) with Viacom's Music and Entertainment group, which includes MTV, Comedy Central, VH1, Spike TV and Logo TV; two additional networks, TV Land and CMT, also joined the Global Entertainment Group. Optimistic that Bakish could make good on his plans to turn Viacom's core U.S. cable networks and its Paramount Pictures film studio around, the board of directors of Viacom Inc. made Bakish's appointment as President and CEO permanent on December 12, 2016.

In early 2017,  Bakish laid out a five-point plan to turn Viacom around and return the company to steady profitability. This consisted of focusing on Viacom's six flagship brands: BET, Comedy Central, MTV, Nickelodeon, Nick Jr. and Paramount; revitalizing content and talent; deepening distributor and advertiser partnerships to drive traditional revenue; increasing digital offerings, consumer products and live experiences; and optimizing and energizing the organization. The strategy also included having Paramount Pictures develop films and franchises connected to Viacom television content; additionally, Spike TV would be rebranded as and converted to a broad-based general entertainment channel, the Paramount Network, in early 2018.

By the fall of 2017 Bakish had restructured Viacom, replacing executives at nearly every company, including hiring Jim Gianopulos - formerly chairman and CEO of 20th Century Fox, as the new chairman and CEO of Paramount Pictures.

In 2018, Bakish's implementation of his five-point comprehensive strategy was credited with Viacom's much improved finances and improved company morale and focus. In 2018, under Bakish's direction and in accordance with his plan to capture younger and digital markets, Viacom acquired digital platform WhoSay, internet video conference VidCon, and online television network AwesomenessTV. In early 2018, Bakish also announced the launch of an official Viacom streaming service, which will support ads and will include series and content from Viacom that hasn't been available on other streaming services.<ref>Steinberg, Brian. "Viacom Plots Launch of Streaming Service". Variety. February 28, 2018.</ref> In April 2018, Viacom launched Viacom Digital Studios, which will create new original content hosted on sites such as Facebook, Twitter and Snapchat.Jarvey, Natalie. "Viacom Unveils Digital Studio With Series Slate, VidCon Expansion". The Hollywood Reporter. April 30, 2018.Weprin, Alex. "Viacom Formally Introduces Viacom Digital Studios At NewFront". MediaPost. April 30, 2018. In addition, later that June, Bakish announced that Viacom will produce some new series exclusively for Netflix, beginning with Nickelodeon-related content.Nicolaou, Anna. "Viacom strikes Nickelodeon deal with Netflix". Financial Times. September 18, 2018.Amidi, Amid. "As Part Of Major Strategic Shift At Viacom, Nick’s Pinky Malinky Will Debut On Netflix". Cartoon Brew. June 22, 2018.

In September 2018, due largely to his turnaround of Viacom, The Hollywood Reporter listed Bakish as #20 in its The Hollywood Reporter'' 100: The Most Powerful People in Entertainment 2018.

Bakish retained the role of CEO when CBS Corporation and Viacom reunited under a single company to form Paramount Global (then known as ViacomCBS), which closed on December 4, 2019.

Board memberships 
Bakish has been on the Board of Directors of Paramount since its merger, and previously at Viacom from December 12, 2016 up until the merger. He is also on the Board of Directors at Avid Technology, Inc.  

He is on the Board of Overseers at Columbia Business School, and is also an active member of its Media & Technology Forum. He is also on the Board of Visitors at Columbia University's School of Engineering and Applied Science.

Bakish was previously Chairman of the board of Viacom 18 Media from 2007 until February 28, 2018.  He was also Chairman of the Cable Television Advertising Bureau from 2003 to 2005.

Personal life 
Bakish and his wife Dee live in New York and have two daughters.

References

External links 
 Official bio at ViacomCBS

American chief executives in the media industry
American television executives
Columbia School of Engineering and Applied Science alumni
Columbia Business School alumni
Booz Allen Hamilton people
Dwight-Englewood School alumni
People from Englewood, New Jersey
Living people
1963 births
Paramount Global people
American chief executives of Fortune 500 companies
American people of Jewish descent